Zion Congregational Church is located in Alto, Wisconsin. It was added to the National Register of Historic Places for its architectural significance in 2006.

References

 “History of Zion Congregational Church Gereformeede Gemeente.” 1999.

Churches on the National Register of Historic Places in Wisconsin
Congregational churches in Wisconsin
Churches in Fond du Lac County, Wisconsin
Churches completed in 1858
National Register of Historic Places in Fond du Lac County, Wisconsin